Cool Is Just a Number is the debut extended play by American chiptune-based rock band I Fight Dragons. It was self-released in 2009, and later re-released on Photo Finish Records in May 2010 with extra track, "Don't You". The track "Money" was used for WWE's Money in the Bank pay-per-view event in 2010.

Track listing

Personnel 
Brian Mazzaferri – Lead Vocals, Guitar
Mike Mentzer – Vocals, Guitar
Hari Rao – Bass
Laura Green – Vocals
Packy Lundholm – Drums
Bill Prokopow – Vocals, Keys

References 

2009 debut EPs
I Fight Dragons albums